Pro Pinball is a pinball video game series developed by Cunning Developments and published by Empire Interactive.

Games

Pro Pinball: The Web (1996)

Information needed

Pro Pinball: Timeshock! (1997)

Information needed

Pro Pinball: Big Race USA (1999)

Information needed

Pro Pinball: Fantastic Journey (2000)

Information needed

Compilation
Pro Pinball Trilogy is a compilation of 3 games in the Pro Pinball video game series, which were Pro Pinball: Timeshock!, Pro Pinball: Big Race USA and Pro Pinball: Fantastic Journey. It was first released for Dreamcast in 2001 before it was ported over to PlayStation 2, Xbox, Apple Macintosh, and Microsoft Windows in 2005 under the title Ultimate Pro Pinball.

Pro Pinball Ultra
Barnstorm Games, owner of Silverball Studios, a company created by the Pro Pinball original developers, launched a Kickstarter project in order to cover the cost for a remake of Pro Pinball: Timeshock! called The ULTRA Edition. It successfully surpassed the £40,000 goal with £49,349. The new version was released for Windows, Mac, iOS, Android, Xbox Live and Linux.
The iOS version of the game was released on January 29, 2015 and the PC version was released on July 21, 2016.

References

External links
Revival website

Action video games
Pinball video games
Video game franchises
Video game franchises introduced in 1996